Jean-Philippe Maury is a pastry chef, currently owning iDessert in San Diego and overseeing 2 pastry shops aboard a cruiseship.

Biography
Jean-Philippe was born and raised in Perpignan in the south of France. At the age of 8, he often helped his aunt out whenever she was baking, which sparked his curiosity and inspiration for pastries. Maury has two Certificat d'Aptitude Professionelle (CAP) in hotel management and baking. At the age of 16, he began to pursue a career as a pastry chef, starting his training in pastry at L'École Hôtelière du Moulin à Vent and later went on to complete his master studies at La Chambre de Métiers in Perpignan, receiving his degree in 1991.

In 1997, Maury moved to New York City to work with chef François Payard. During the same year, he also won the Meilleur Ouvrier de France (MOF) title for pastry. In 2002 and 2004, he was given the title of World Champion in pastry, once as a participant in 2002, and once as coach in 2004, thus officially holding a double title. Maury's team was featured in a two-page feature story in Newsweek and an hour-long program on the Food Network.

Maury has also appeared on TLC for the "Fabulous Cakes" show, and was also a guest judge on season 3 of "The Next Iron Chef" on the Food Network.

Pastry shops 
In 1998, Maury was offered the position as executive pastry chef and opened up Jean-Philippe Pâtisserie at the AAA Five Diamond Bellagio in Las Vegas, Nevada. His shop oversees the dessert production for 17 gourmet restaurants, room service, and all catering functions. His shop at the Bellagio also holds the world's largest chocolate fountain, as of April 2008.

In December 2009, Maury was appointed executive pastry chef in Aria Resort and Casino|ARIA Resort & Casino in Las Vegas, Nevada. He opened a second store, Jean-Philippe Pâtisserie, that year at Aria. Maury collaborated on the kitchen's design, spanning over 6000 square feet. This allowed him to have a single location to produce all of his pastries. After a few years, Maury left his position as executive pastry chef of Aria in 2011 to focus on other future endeavors with his work. In April 2018, his partnership ended with Bellagio and Aria Resort, so the 2 Jean Philippe Patisserie are now closed.

In 2015, Maury started his newest project/shop, iDessert, located in San Diego, California. Inspired by an idea for innovative desserts, customers can create their own dessert, sundaes, and milkshakes with a wide variety of ingredients.

References

French chefs
Living people
Pastry chefs
Year of birth missing (living people)